The Bank of America Building, originally known as the First National Bank Building, is a highrise located in downtown Midland, Texas.  It is designed by Texas architect George Dahl and built in 1952 (completed in 1978). It remains the tallest building in the city at 24 stories .  The building is located at 303 W. Wall St. and currently houses various oil and gas companies as well as Bank of America, Midland.

Images

See also 
 List of tallest buildings in Midland, Texas

Bank of America buildings
Skyscraper office buildings in Midland, Texas